SS Russell A. Alger, (MC hull 1754), was a Liberty ship named after Russell A. Alger, a Michigan Senator, Governor and U.S. Secretary of War.

Russell A. Alger was placed under a standard WSA operating agreement with Union Sulphur Company at Portland, Oregon upon delivery. That operating agreement continued through the war until the ship was placed in the Reserve Fleet, Mobile on 18 October 1946.

On 19 February 1947 the ship was taken out of reserve pending bareboat charter to South Atlantic Steamship Line which took effect 14 June 1947 at New Orleans and was then converted to an agreement with the Maritime Commission 9 September 1949 in preparation for layup 20 September 1949 at Beaumont, Texas. The ship was brought out of reserve a final time on for operation under an MC agreement by Pacific Far East Lines on 15 August 1951 before entering the reserve at Beaumont a final time on 9 June 1952. The ship was sold for $96,666 to Consolidated Steel for scrap on 9 May 1973 and physically withdrawn from the fleet on 16 May.

Footnotes

References 

Liberty ships